An automatic dialer (also spelled auto dialer, auto-dialer, and autodialer) is an electronic device or software that automatically dials telephone numbers. Once the call has been answered, the autodialer either plays a recorded message or connects the call to a live person.

When an autodialer plays a pre-recorded message, it is often called voice broadcasting, or robocalling. Some voice broadcasting messages ask the person who answers to press a button on their phone keypad, such as in opinion polls in which recipients are asked to press one digit if they support one side of an issue, or another digit if they support the other side. This type of call is often called outbound interactive voice response.

When an autodialer connects an answered call to a live agent, it is often called a predictive dialer or power dialer. A predictive dialer uses real-time analysis to determine the optimal time to dial more numbers, whereas a power dialer simply dials a pre-set number of lines when an agent finishes the previous call.

Key features

Answering machine detection
An important technology for autodialers is the ability to distinguish live human pick-ups from answering machines. Since there is no indication hardware signal when a call is answered by an answering machine or voice-mail system, autodialer systems have to analyze incoming audio for a prediction.

Compliance
Anybody wishing to use an autodialer to legally contact many people will need to maintain compliance with the relevant laws in their country. The ability to maintain records, demonstrate drop call percentages on campaigns and avoid calling numbers listed in any federal, state, or company 'Do Not Call' lists is essential for continued legal use of any autodialer. Certain organizations are exempt from certain compliance laws, but the bulk of autodialers are built for the bulk of users who are required to comply, and in many cases must be able to demonstrate their compliance upon demand of a regulatory entity.

Although such devices are being used legitimately all over the world, there are also companies, organizations, and individuals who use them to commit fraud and perpetrate scams on unwitting recipients, often the elderly, or those unaware of their rights. In this event, the existence of government 'Do Not Call' registers or lists has little effect on their operations. In order to try to control what is a growing business, organizations have attempted to create codes of practice for those operating in their industry which may make use of auto dialers.

Modem versus telephony boards
A regular PC, desktop or laptop, can be turned into an autodialer by using a telephony board or modem. There are software programs that can set up an autodialer-like function over a physical telephone line using such hardware. It is also possible to run cheap or free autodialers without a modem or telephone line using the Internet and VoIP.

Traditional advantages of using telephony cards over simple modems include detecting touch tones and transferring calls directly through to the caller. 

With the advancement of computer software technology at the end of the 20th century, many hardware-based telephony capabilities for auto dialing can be implemented in software. Voice modems are much less expensive and some computers have them pre-installed already.  Touch tones, call transfer, call progress detection, detection of answering machine and voice mail, and other telephony card features, are available in voice modem-based auto dialing systems. For a simple autodialer supporting only a few phone lines per PC, telephony cards offer few advantages over simple voice modems.  

However, with single systems that initiate large volumes of calls simultaneously, telephony cards offload the PC by performing most of the telephony functions (call status determination, playing music on hold, answer machine detection, etc.).  Calls can likewise be cross transferred at the telephony board level.

With the ever-increasing power of modern computers, especially those with multiple cores and multiple processors, autodialers that utilize VOIP can be scaled up well. In today's call centers, autodialers that do not use telephony board can easily make hundreds of simultaneous calls. In addition, call transfer to remote agents is much easier with VOIP technology since no physical telephone wires are needed.

Smart autodialer
A Smart Autodialer is an autodialer capable of personalizing messages and collecting touch-tone or speech feedbacks. A speech engine is usually included for converting text to speech and recognizing speech over the phone.

To customize or personalize messages, a smart autodialer system uses a message template, which contains variables that can be replaced later by actual values. For example, a time variable included in the message template can be replaced by the actual time when a phone call is made.

Semi-automatic dialer
A semi-automatic dialer is a human-controlled dialer. All actions, such as dialing, playing the audio messages, recording, are initiated by a human, normally by the press of a key. It is a productivity tool for telemarketing agents. The first semi-automatic dialer was offered on the commercial market in 1942.  It was manually operated and came in two models; one that stored 12 numbers and a second which could store up to 52 numbers.

Telemarketing dialer
An enterprise-grade dialer must provide two key features. First, it must be capable of making a large number of simultaneous phone calls; and second, it must provide an application programming interface (API) for system integration. Almost all enterprise-grade autodialers employ computer networking technology since voice boards have a fixed number of ports and cannot be scaled up. In order to make 2000 simultaneous phone calls, for example, a group of computers has to be linked together to provide support for that many phone lines. 

Some advanced enterprise dialers are distributed dialers, i.e., independent dialers that are linked together through the Internet and controlled by a call dispatching program. With distributed computing, there is virtually no limit on scalability. All distributed dialers, by definition, can be accessed remotely. Today with optimized and highly specialized coding some companies have been able to sustain 2000 simultaneous calls using only one server and a single 100 Mbit connection.

Natural predictive dialer 
Natural predictive dialing has the benefits of all of the above dialing modes. With natural predictive dialing, call progress analysis (CPA) occurs in parallel with the agent connection, as opposed to the agent being connected after the CPA has determined that a live person is on the phone. This results in the benefits of CPA automation as in predictive dialing while also allowing an agent to always be available as in power dialing. The primary disadvantage of natural predictive dialing is that it is patented and is only available through a single vendor.

Restrictions
The Telephone Consumer Protection Act of 1991 was signed into law, in the United States, in an effort to put restrictions on auto dialing systems. Since then, the FTC has taken additional measures to ensure that consumers can block robocalls and other automated calls by requiring expressed written consent from consumers in order to receiving marketing and other solicitations over the phone.

See also
 Dialer, dialers in general
 Predictive dialer, a type of autodialer
 Spam (electronic)
 Speed dial
 Telemarketing

References

Communication software